Whitmorea is a monotypic genus of flowering plants belonging to the family Stemonuraceae. It only contains one known species, Whitmorea grandiflora.

It is native to the Solomon Islands.

The genus name of Whitmorea is in honour of Timothy Charles Whitmore (1935–2002), an English ecologist, botanist, geologist and climatologist. The Latin specific epithet of grandiflora means large flower from Grandis large and flora meaning flower. Both the genus and the species wre first described and published in Blumea Vol.17 on pages 263-264 in 1969.

References

Stemonuraceae
Monotypic asterid genera
Taxa named by Hermann Otto Sleumer
Plants described in 1969
Flora of the Solomon Islands (archipelago)